IntelliTec College is for-profit technical career training school with locations in Colorado Springs, Pueblo, Albuquerque and Grand Junction. Started in 1965, the college has been in operation for more than fifty years. IntelliTec Colleges’ mission is to build a better community through quality and excellence in career training.

Academics
IntelliTec College provides career training in Colorado and New Mexico with associate degrees (occupational) and professional certificate programs. Campuses are located in Colorado Springs, Grand Junction, Albuquerque, and Pueblo.

Accreditation
IntelliTec College is accredited by the Accrediting Commission of Career Schools and Colleges (https://www.accsc.org/directory/). All of the IntelliTec College campuses are regulated by the Department of Education and local state entities (Colorado Department of Higher Education - DPOS: https://highered.colorado.gov/Data/InstSelect.aspx?division=DPOS; Colorado Department of Regulatory Agencies - DORA: https://dora.colorado.gov/public-information; New Mexico Higher Education Department - NMHED: https://hed.state.nm.us/resources-for-schools/private-post-secondary-schools/private-post-secondary-school-directory; New Mexico Regulation and Licensing Department (Massage): http://www.rld.state.nm.us/boards/Massage_Therapy.aspx).

Campus locations
 Pueblo Campus
 Colorado Springs Campus
 Grand Junction Campus
 Albuquerque Campus

External links
Official website

For-profit universities and colleges in the United States
Private universities and colleges in Colorado
Two-year colleges in the United States
Education in Colorado Springs, Colorado
Education in Pueblo County, Colorado
Education in Mesa County, Colorado
Educational institutions established in 1965
1965 establishments in Colorado